The Man Who Didn't Fly is a detective novel by the Scottish author Margot Bennett. It was published originally in 1955. It was shortlisted for the Gold Dagger award for crime-writing that year.

Premise
A private plane crashes, killing both of its passengers. Yet, whilst investigating, the police come to suspect that a third passenger never boarded the plane and orchestrated the crash as a means of faking his own death.

TV Adaptation
Kraft Theatre adapted the novel as an hour-long TV episode in 1958. The episode (whose principal cast included a young William Shatner) aired at 9pm on Wednesday 16 July. The screenplay was written by Bennett herself.

Availability
The novel was reissued in 2020.

References

External links
Adaptation at IMDb
In Reference to Murder

1955 British novels
British detective novels
British thriller novels
Novels by Margot Bennett
Novels set in Wales
Novels set in London
Novels set in Ireland
Eyre & Spottiswoode books